Ikatan is an unincorporated community in the Aleutians East Borough of the U.S. state of Alaska.  Named after Ikatan Peninsula, it is located on Unimak Island.

Demographics

Ikatan first appeared on the 1950 U.S. Census as an unincorporated area. This was the only time it appeared on the census as a separate community. It had reported under Unimak (population 59) in 1930 and 1940 (88), but this also included False Pass. As of 2010, the former village area is now partly located within False Pass.

References

Unimak Island
Unincorporated communities in Aleutians East Borough, Alaska
Populated coastal places in Alaska on the Pacific Ocean
Road-inaccessible communities of Alaska
Unincorporated communities in Alaska